Laurent Thirionet (born 22 November 1970) is a retired French Paralympic cyclist who competed in international track cycling and road cycling elite events. He is a five-time World champion and a double Paralympic champion. Thirionet had his left leg amputated above the knee after being involved in a traffic accident in Dunkirk. He started cycling after his accident and won his first medals at the 2000 Summer Paralympics.

References

External links
 
 

1970 births
Living people
People from Bergues
Paralympic cyclists of France
French male cyclists
Cyclists at the 2000 Summer Paralympics
Cyclists at the 2004 Summer Paralympics
Cyclists at the 2008 Summer Paralympics
Cyclists at the 2012 Summer Paralympics
Medalists at the 2000 Summer Paralympics
Medalists at the 2004 Summer Paralympics
Medalists at the 2008 Summer Paralympics
Medalists at the 2012 Summer Paralympics
Cyclists from Hauts-de-France